Zbyněk Hubač (born 1 September 1940 in Trutnov) is a Czechoslovakian former ski jumper who competed from 1962 to 1973. His lone victory was at Innsbruck during the 1970–71 Four Hills Tournament.

Hubač also competed in three Winter Olympics, earning his best finish of 19th twice (Individual large hill: 1968, Individual large hill: 1964).

References
 
 Sports-Reference.com profile

1940 births
20th-century Czech people
Czechoslovak male ski jumpers
Czech male ski jumpers
Living people
Olympic ski jumpers of Czechoslovakia
Ski jumpers at the 1964 Winter Olympics
Ski jumpers at the 1968 Winter Olympics
Ski jumpers at the 1972 Winter Olympics
People from Trutnov
Sportspeople from the Hradec Králové Region